The Booze Hangs High, released in December 1930, is the fourth title in the Looney Tunes series. The short features Bosko, Warner Bros.' first cartoon character.

Plot
The scene opens with a close up shot of a cow's rear end. She moos as she walks away, tail and udders swaying in time to Turkey in the Straw. Bosko appears and does a Mexican style dance with the cow. At one point, the cow's "pants" drop, revealing polka-dotted underwear. Bosko points at it and laughs, at which the cow pulls her pants back on and walks off in a huff—with her nose up and tail held erect.

Next, Bosko laughs heartily at a horse and the horse laughs back. He then climbs onto the horse carriage and uses a whip to play the horse's tail like a violin. He "tunes" the horse by twisting his ear. The horse seems to enjoy the music and dances in an odd fashion. He skates along, floats a few feet above the ground and makes swishing movements, with his hooves, as if mimicking a mop. Bosko then takes a pitchfork and starts playing it like a banjo, as the horse begins trotting on two legs.

The scene cuts to three ducklings and their mother. Whilst walking in single file, they start bouncing on their rears in tune to the music. The mother duck starts to sway and the ducklings follow her lead. One of the ducklings, crosses its legs and whispers something in the mother duck's ear. She undoes a flap on his rear, as if he was wearing pants, and motions him off screen, presumably to relieve himself. When he returns, she replaces the flap and they all jump into a pond.

The scene moves back to Bosko and the horse. It seems to be an exact repeat of the earlier dance routine, with Bosko playing the horse's tail while the horse goes through his unique dance moves. Bosko eventually slides down the horse's neck and goes to feed the pigs, who seem to be squealing in hunger. He tilts a trash can into their trough, and they eat greedily. One of the piglets finds a bottle of booze and tries to loosen the cork. Eventually, he manages to open it using the other piglet's tail as a corkscrew. Bubbles begin to float out, and the piglets pop them merrily, making xylophone-like sounds that play How dry I am. They start drinking it and soon get drunk. Their father comes over and starts drinking from the bottle too. He laughs with a deep bass guffaw and sings One Little Drink, using nonsense syllables. He gestures expressively and flings the bottle away which shatters against Bosko's head.

Bosko becomes soaked in booze and inebriated. He walks over to the pigs and they sing Sweet Adeline together, barbershop style. The father pig launches into One Little Drink again, but the effort causes him to belch up a corn cob. Looking embarrassed, he uses his belly button like a knob to open the door to his stomach and puts the cob back inside. He starts to sing again and Bosko helps him reach for the final low note by pulling his tail, which deflates him temporarily.

Bosko and the pigs dance some more until the end credits.

Production
This cartoon opens when the blackness of the title card becomes the back of a cow's udder, as it did in Plane Crazy (a Mickey Mouse cartoon which Harman and Ising worked on) and a musical operetta film Song of the Flame (which is now lost). The latter features a song titled The Goose Hangs High from which this short gets its name.

Reception
Variety reviewed the film on September 9, 1930: "Funny piece built around the song, 'The Goose Hangs High', and latter's amusing lyrics that offer adaptation to the cartoon with good effect. Can be used anywhere for filler... The music and the rhythm plus the synchronous voices make the subject entertaining."

However, the October 4, 1930 review in Motion Picture News was less kind: "Production value of this one rates high, but entertainment value is lowered because of the absence of originality in gags — a trait predominating in most of the cartoons of the current age. Here and there, we find in this Looney Tune a clever twist, easily recognized from the cut-and-tried material depended upon for laughs. Audience reaction was favorable."

See also
 List of animated films in the public domain in the United States

References

External links
 
 The Booze Hangs High at The Internet Archive
 

1930 films
1930 animated films
American black-and-white films
Looney Tunes shorts
Warner Bros. Cartoons animated short films
Films about music and musicians
Films directed by Hugh Harman
Films directed by Rudolf Ising
Bosko films
Films scored by Frank Marsales
African-American animated films
Animated films about animals
1930s Warner Bros. animated short films
1930s English-language films